Bubblegum, Lemonade &... Something for Mama is the second solo album released by Cass Elliot under the billing "Mama Cass". It was recorded in 1969 and arranged and produced by Steve Barri. The album was originally released on July 5, 1969, with only 11 tracks. It was released again on December 6, 1969, under a new title and with a different album cover as Make Your Own Kind of Music/It’s Getting Better. "Make Your Own Kind of Music" had just become a hit and was added to the album.

Primarily a "bubblegum" pop album, it contained several other types of music, including country, tin pan alley, and jazz.

Conception
The album came after the disaster of Elliot’s collapse during her Vegas show in 1968. Plagued with bills, the studio executives at Dunhill took creative control and felt that the fastest and easiest solution would be to have Elliot record an album full of music similar to what she had done with The Mamas & the Papas. Steve Barri was appointed by Dunhill to arrange the album and choose the material.

Reception

The album was a moderate success when first released reaching up to the 91st spot on the Billboard 200 chart. It landed at the 169th spot when re-released in December. The album did spawn three successful singles with "It's Getting Better" and "Make Your Own Kind of Music" both placing in the Top 40. "Move in a Little Closer, Baby", originally recorded by British band Harmony Grass, reached a Billboard Hot 100 peak of No. 58.

The songs from this album remain among the most popular of Elliot’s solo career. Many of the songs were featured in the play and 1996 film Beautiful Thing. In the film, the album can be seen hanging on the wall of the character Leah. "It’s Getting Better" and "Make Your Own Kind of Music" have both been featured on the hit series Lost.

The album was re-released on CD in 2002 by MCA Japan with the original album cover and "Make Your Own Kind of Music" added on as a bonus track. The album was also released in 2005 as part of the compilation CD The Complete Cass Elliot Collection: 1968-71.

Track listing

July 1969
"It's Getting Better" (Barry Mann, Cynthia Weil) - 3:00
"Blow Me a Kiss" (Jack Carone) - 2:50
"Sour Grapes" (Tom Ghent) - 2:35
"Easy Come, Easy Go" (Diane Hildebrand, Jack Keller) - 2:45
"I Can Dream, Can't I?" (Sammy Fain, Irving Kahal) - 2:35
"Welcome to the World" (Martin Siegel, Scott English) - 2:18
"Lady Love" (Delaney Bramlett) - 3:04
"He's a Runner" (Laura Nyro) - 3:38
"Move in a Little Closer, Baby" (Robert O'Connor, Arnold Capitanelli) - 2:38
"When I Just Wear My Smile" (Tom Lane, Sharyn Pulley) - 2:20
"Who's to Blame" (Leah Kunkel) - 2:55

December 1969
"Make Your Own Kind of Music" (Barry Mann, Cynthia Weil)
"Blow Me a Kiss" (Jack Carone)
"It's Getting Better" (Barry Mann, Cynthia Weil)
"Easy Come, Easy Go (Diane Hildebrand, Jack Keller)
"I Can Dream, Can't I?" (Sammy Fain, Irving Kahal)
"Welcome to the World" (Martin Siegel, Scott English)
"Lady Love" (Delaney Bramlett)
"He's a Runner" (Laura Nyro)
"Move in a Little Closer, Baby" (Robert O'Connor, Arnold Capitanelli)
"When I Just Wear My Smile" (Tom Lane, Sharyn Pulley)
"Who's to Blame" (Leah Kunkel)
"Sour Grapes" (Tom Ghent)

Personnel
Mama Cass – vocals
Mike Deasy – guitar
Red Rhodes – steel guitar
Hal Blaine – drums, percussion
Steve Barri – percussion
Ben Benay – guitar, harmonica
Jimmie Haskell – accordion, arranger, conductor
Phil Kaye – percussion, engineer
Larry Knechtel – organ, piano
Joe Osborn – bass

Technical
Gary Burden – art direction, design
Henry Diltz – photography

Charts

References 

1969 albums
Cass Elliot albums
Dunhill Records albums
Albums arranged by Jimmie Haskell
Albums conducted by Jimmie Haskell
Albums produced by Steve Barri